Prince Christian of Schaumburg-Lippe (20 February 1898 – 13 July 1974) was a German prince and head of the Náchod branch of the princely house of Schaumburg-Lippe.

Early life 

He was born on 20 February 1898 in Sopron, Hungary as the only son and second child of Frederick of Schaumburg-Lippe (1868–1945) and his first wife Princess Louise of Denmark, younger sister of King Christian X of Denmark.

Marriage and issue 
In 1927, his engagement to Princess Irene of Greece and Denmark, a daughter of Constantine I of Greece was announced. Nothing ever came of these plans, however. She later married Prince Aimone of Savoy-Aosta.

He was also briefly considered as a marriage candidate for Princess Juliana, the heiress to the Dutch throne. They had met each other in 1932 in Mecklenburg, the home of Juliana’s paternal relations. His reputation as a womanizer, his previous called off engagement and his German heritage did not make him a popular choice, but he was reconsidered after other candidates were rejected by the Queen or Juliana herself.
These plans, however, did not prove fruitful either.

On 9 September 1937, he married his cousin, Princess Feodora, daughter of Prince Harald of Denmark, a younger brother of King Christian X and Princess Louise, at Fredensborg Palace, Zealand, Denmark; they had four children.

 Prince Wilhelm of Schaumburg-Lippe (b. 19 August 1939)
 Prince Waldemar of Schaumburg-Lippe (19 December 1940-11 August 2020)
 Princess Marie of Schaumburg-Lippe (b. 27 December 1945)
 Prince Harald of Schaumburg-Lippe (b. 27 March 1948)

Later life 
He died aged 76 on 13 July 1974 at Bückeburg, a year before his wife.

His four children live in Germany and Denmark.

Ancestry

References

Citations

Bibliography

 

1898 births
1974 deaths
House of Lippe
Princes of Schaumburg-Lippe
German expatriates in Hungary
People from Sopron